Leonardo José Talamonti (born 12 November 1981 in Álvarez, Santa Fe) is an Argentine football former defender who last played for Platense.

Career
Talamonti began his career with Rosario Central in the city of Rosario in Argentina and after making almost 100 appearances for the club he was loaned to Italian Serie A side Lazio. But after only one year in Italy he returned to Argentina to play for River Plate. In the summer of 2006 he began playing with Atalanta.

On 4 July 2011, he mutually terminated his contract with Atalanta. Later, in the same month, Talamonti returns to Argentina, signing with Rosario Central. After stints in Sportivo Belgrano and Atlanta, he transferred to Platense in 2016.

References

External links
  Atalanta B.C. Official Player Profile
 Guardian statistics

Argentine footballers
Argentine expatriate footballers
Association football defenders
Club Atlético Atlanta footballers
Rosario Central footballers
S.S. Lazio players
Club Atlético River Plate footballers
Atalanta B.C. players
Argentine Primera División players
Serie A players
Serie B players
Expatriate footballers in Italy
Argentine expatriate sportspeople in Italy
People from Rosario Department
1981 births
Living people
Sportspeople from Santa Fe Province